The Russian Mountains (Russian Mission Mountains) are a mountain range in Bethel Census Area, Alaska, USA.
 
The mountains were named during the "Yellow River Stampede" of the winter of 1900-01 because a Russian Orthodox Mission was located on the south edge of the range.

The range extends north from the Kuskokwim River and east of the Owhat River. It is 9 miles northeast of Aniak, Kilbuck-Kuskokwim Mountains.

References

Landforms of Bethel Census Area, Alaska
Mountain ranges of Alaska
Mountains of Unorganized Borough, Alaska